Amaranta Gómez Regalado (born 1977) is a Mexican Muxe social anthropologist, political candidate, HIV prevention activist, social researcher, columnist and promoter of pre-Columbian indigenous cultural identity.

Biography
Gómez was born in 1977 in a Zapotec village close to the border of Guatemala and adopted the name of Amaranta during adolescence, after reading One Hundred Years of Solitude, the famous work of Colombian writer Gabriel García Márquez.

During high school, Gómez Regalado studied languages and theater in Veracruz. She then traveled to several states in southern Mexico as part of a transvestism show.

In October 2002, a car accident fractured her left arm to such an extent that it had to be amputated.

In 2015 she managed to change her gender identity on her birth certificate, which allowed her to change other official documents such as a passport. This was possible from the reforms approved by what was once the Legislative Assembly of Mexico City to allow people to legally change their gender identity in their birth certificate, through only an administrative procedure. (See LGBT rights in Mexico#Gender identity and expression.)

She studied social anthropology at the University of Veracruz between 2011 and 2016. Her undergraduate thesis was titled Guendaranaxhii: the Muxe community of the Isthmus of Tehuantepec and the emotional erotic relations.

Activism
At the age of 25, she gained international prominence as a candidate for the México Posible party in the 2003 elections to the Federal Congress. Her broad platform included calls for the decriminalization of marijuana and abortion. Regalado did not win a seat.

Recognition
The Escuela Amaranta Gómez Regalado in Santiago, Chile is named for her.

References

1977 births
Living people
Politicians from Oaxaca
Mexican LGBT rights activists
Transgender politicians
Transgender women
Indigenous leaders of the Americas
21st-century Mexican women politicians
21st-century Mexican politicians
Indigenous people of South America
Mexican LGBT politicians
Zapotec people
Muxe people
Mexican anthropologists
Mexican women anthropologists
Mexican amputees
Indigenous Mexican women
Women civil rights activists
20th-century Native Americans
21st-century Native Americans
21st-century LGBT people
Scientists with disabilities